The 1956 Wake Forest Demon Deacons football team was an American football team that represented Wake Forest University during the 1956 NCAA University Division football season. In their first season under head coach Paul Amen, the Demon Deacons compiled a 2–5–3 record and finished in seventh place in the Atlantic Coast Conference with a 1–5–1 record against conference opponents.

Halfback Billy Ray Barnes rushed for over 1,000 yards and was selected by the Associated Press as a first-team player on the 1956 All-Atlantic Coast Conference football team.

Schedule

Team leaders

References

Wake Forest
Wake Forest Demon Deacons football seasons
Wake Forest Demon Deacons football